The Albania national beach soccer team represents Albania in international beach soccer competitions and is controlled by the Shoqata Sportive Minifutbolli Shqiptar] (Albanian MiniFootball Association), 
The Albania national team made their debut in a friendly match in 2012 against an unofficial Kosovan team whom, at the time, were not yet sanctioned by FIFA to take part in official international matches. A rarity in beach soccer, but more commonly found in friendlies, the match was ended as a draw. Albania followed this up with their competitive debut in 2015 at the Mediterranean Beach Games. The squad contains many of the same players who also play for the Albania national futsal team.

Current squad
As of September 2015

  (captain)

Coach: Ergys Kadiu
Delegation: Klodian Kadiu, Engert Bakalli,

Team Manager: Nderim Kaceli

Achievements
 Mediterranean Beach Games Best: 9th place
 2015

Competitive record

Mediterranean Beach Games

Sources

Squad
Results

European national beach soccer teams
Beach Soccer